LGBT rights in the European Union are protected under the European Union's (EU) treaties and law. Same-sex sexual activity is legal in all EU member states and discrimination in employment has been banned since 2000. However, EU states have different laws when it comes to any greater protection, same-sex civil union, same-sex marriage, adoption by same-sex couples.

Treaty protections
The Treaty on European Union, in its last version as updated by the Treaty of Lisbon in 2007 and in force as of 2009, makes the Charter of Fundamental Rights of the European Union legally binding for the member state of the European Union and the European Union itself. In turn, Article 21 of the Charter of Fundamental Rights of the European Union includes an anti-discrimination provision that states that "any discrimination based on any ground such as [...] sexual orientation shall be prohibited."

Furthermore, the Treaty on the Functioning of the European Union provides in Articles 10 that the European Union has a positive duty to combat discrimination (among other things) on the grounds of sexual orientation and provides in Article 19 ways for the Council and the European Parliament to actively propose pass legislation to do so. These provisions were enacted by the Treaty of Amsterdam in 1999.

Legislative protection

Discrimination in employment 
Following the inclusion in the Treaties of the above-mentioned provisions, Directive 2000/78/EC "Directive establishing a general framework for equal treatment in employment and occupation" was enacted in 2000. This framework directive compels all EU states to adopt anti-discrimination legislation in employment. That legislation has to include provisions to protect people from discrimination on the basis of sexual orientation.

In practice, this protects EU citizens from being refused a job, or from being fired, because of their sexual orientation. It also protects them from being harassed by a colleague due to their sexual orientation.

Discrimination in the provisioning of goods and services
Directive 2000/78/EC does not cover being refused medical services or treatment, refusal of being given a double room in a hotel, protection from bullying in a school and refusal of social security schemes (e.g. survivors' pensions and financial assistance to carers). Protection under EU law in these circumstances exists, but is granted on the grounds of race or gender only.

As such, in 2008, a proposal of a Directive to more broadly fight discrimination has been introduced, which would outlaw discrimination in the areas of social protection, social advantages, education and access to supply of goods, on the basis of religious belief, disability, age, and sexual orientation. However, despite strong support from the European Parliament, the directive has since been stalled in the Council.

Transgender rights
EU law currently takes a different approach to transgender issues. Despite the European Parliament adopting a resolution on transgender rights as early as 1989, transgender identity is not incorporated into any EU funding and was not mentioned in the law establishing the European Institute for Gender Equality (EIGE) as sexual orientation was. However, the case law of the European Court of Justice provides some protection by interpreting discrimination on the basis of 'sex' to also refer to people who have had 'gender reassignment'. Thus all EU sex discrimination law applies to transgender people. In 2002, the 1976 equal treatment directive was revised to include discrimination based on gender identity, to reflect case law on the directive.

Intersex rights

In February 2019, the European Parliament adopted a resolution on the rights of intersex people. The resolution called European Union member states to legislate better policies that protected intersex individuals, especially from unnecessary surgery and discrimination. It stated that the parliament "strongly condemns sex-normalizing treatments and surgery; welcomes laws that prohibit such surgery, as in Malta and Portugal, and encourages other member states to adopt similar legislation as soon as possible." The resolution also urged legal gender recognition based on self-determination. It also confirms that intersex people are "exposed to multiple instances of violence and discrimination in the European Union" and calls on the European Commission and the Members States to propose legislation to address these issues. It also includes the need of adequate counselling and support for intersex people and their families, measures to end the stigma and pathologisation intersex people face and increased funding for intersex-led civil society organisations.

Other actions
Between 2001 and 2006, a Community Action Programme to Combat Discrimination involved the expenditure of €100 million to fight discrimination in a number of areas, including sexual orientation.

In 2009, the European Commission has acted to tone down a law in Lithuania that included homophobic language and also aimed to support the gay pride parade in the country and others under threat of banning.

Foreign relations
In June 2010, the Council of the European Union adopted a non-binding toolkit to promote LGBT people's human rights.

In June 2013, the Council upgraded it to binding LGBTI Guidelines instructing EU diplomats around the world to defend the human rights of LGBTI people.

Same-sex unions

Same-sex marriage has been legalised in Austria, Belgium, Denmark, Finland, France, Germany, Ireland, Luxembourg, Malta, the Netherlands, Portugal, Slovenia, Spain, and Sweden. Same-sex civil unions have been legalised in Austria, Belgium, Croatia, Cyprus, Czechia, Estonia, France, Greece, Hungary, Italy, Luxembourg, Malta, the Netherlands,  Slovenia, and Spain. In Denmark, Sweden, Finland, and Ireland, civil partnerships were legal between 1989 and 2012, and between 1995 and 2009, and between 2002 and 2017, and between 2011 and 2015, respectively. In Germany, registered life partnerships were legal between 2001 and 2017. However, existing civil unions/registered life partnerships are still recognised in all of these countries.

Bulgaria, Croatia, Hungary, Latvia, Lithuania, Poland and Slovakia have constitutionally defined marriage as being between a man and a woman. In December 2020, Hungary also explicitly legally banned adoption for same-sex couples within its constitution. 

European Union law (the Citizens’ Rights Directive 2004/38/EC) requires those member states that legalised same-sex partnerships to recognise each other's partnerships for the purpose of freedom of movement. The European Parliament has however approved a report calling for mutual recognition.

According to European Court of Justice case law based on the Employment Equality Framework Directive, employees in a civil partnership with a same-sex partner must be granted the same benefits as those granted to their colleagues upon their marriage, where marriage is not possible for same-sex couples. The Court established this principle in 2008 in the case of Tadao Maruko v. Versorgungsanstalt der deutschen Bühnen with regards to a German registered life partnership. In December 2013, the Court confirmed this in the case of Frédéric Hay v. Crédit agricole mutuel (C-267/12) with regards to a French civil solidarity pact, which is significantly inferior to marriage than a German registered life partnership.

Also, according to the European Court of Justice in the case of Coman and Others, by judgement of 5 June 2018, a "spouse" (or partner or any other family member) in the Free Movement Directive (2004/38/EC) includes a (foreign) same-sex spouse; member states are required to confer the right of residence on the (foreign) same-sex spouse of a citizen of the European Union. However, most of east-central European new EU member countries (A8 countries) do not recognise same-sex unions themselves, Bulgaria, Latvia, Lithuania and Romania, but are still bound by a ruling by the European Court of Justice to recognise same-sex marriages performed within the EU and including an EU citizen for the purposes of granting legal residence, though they do not always respect this ruling in practice (in case of Romania is still ignoring implementation of the ruling).

Family rights
In 2021, 10 EU member states refused to recognize same-sex couples as joint parents to their children. This leads to situations where two people recognized as parents in one country would have their family ties legally dissolve after crossing a border. A frequently encountered issue is that birth certificates issued in one member state and listing two people of the same sex as parents are not recognized in other countries. Some children do not have passports as a result. The pending CJEU case V.M.A. v. Stolichna Obsthina involves a child who could not claim Bulgarian nationality because her parents were a lesbian couple. A policy brief commissioned by European Parliament Committee on Petitions recommends that the European Commission or the CJEU should clarify that Directive 2004/38 on free movement also applies to rainbow families, who should not be discriminated against in their exercise of EU free movement rights. The case was finally decided on 14 December 2021, with the CJEU accepting the position of the European Parliament Committee on Petitions, and finding Bulgaria in breach of EU law for not issuing documents to the child of the lesbian couple. The decision points out that while it is still a Member State's prerogative to decide whether or not to extend same-sex marriage and LGBT adoption rights to its own citizen, this choice cannot come at the expense of the child being deprived of the relationship of one of her parents while exercising her rights to freedom of movement within the EU.

Conversion therapy
In March 2018, a majority of representatives in the European Parliament passed a resolution in a 435–109 vote condemning conversion therapy and urging European Union member states to ban the practice. A report released by the European Parliament Intergroup on LGBT Rights after the measure was passed stated that "Currently, only Malta and some regions in Spain have explicitly banned LGBTI conversion therapies." Conversion therapy for minors was banned in Germany in 2020 and in France in 2022. Bans have also been proposed in Ireland, Netherlands, and Austria.

Member State laws on sexual orientation

Openly gay people are allowed to serve in the military of every EU country since 2018.

In December 2016, Malta became the first country in the EU – as well as in Europe – to ban conversion therapy.

Due to the Cyprus dispute placing Northern Cyprus outside the Republic of Cyprus' control, EU law is suspended in the area governed by the self-proclaimed Turkish Republic of Northern Cyprus.

Public opinion

Below is the share of respondents per country who agreed with the following statements in the 2019 Eurobarometer on Discrimination.

See also

 LGBT rights in Europe
 LGBT adoption in Europe
 Recognition of same-sex unions in Europe
 Article 8 of the European Convention on Human Rights
 European Union Fundamental Rights Agency
 LGBT ideology-free zone

References

External links
 The European Parliament's Intergroup on LGBT Rights
 LGBT, European Union Fundamental Rights Agency
 European Union and LGBT rights, ILGA-Europe

European Union
European Union law
European Union